"Day the Earth Caught Fire" is a song by the Japanese horror punk band Balzac from their 1995 album The Last Men on Earth. In 2002 it was covered by the Misfits for a split single celebrating Balzac's signing to the newly formed Misfits Records, with Balzac covering a medley of the Misfits songs "The Haunting" and "Don't Open 'Til Doomsday" from the 1997 album American Psycho. Balzac also filmed a music video for their version. The international version of the single was titled "Day the Earth Caught Fire" and had the Misfits as track 1 and Balzac as track 2, while the Japanese release was titled "Don't Open 'Til Doomsday" and had the tracks in reverse order.

The DVD included with the Misfits' Project 1950 album in 2003 included live videos of the Misfits performing "Day the Earth Caught Fire" in New York City with Balzac singer Hirosuke, Balzac performing "The Haunting/Don't Open 'Til Doomsday" in Tokyo with Misfits members Jerry Only and Dez Cadena, and Balzac performing "Day the Earth Caught Fire" in Japan with Jerry Only. It also included Balzac's music videos for "The Haunting/Don't Open 'Til Doomsday" and their own song "Out of the Blue".

Track listing

Personnel

Misfits
Jerry Only - bass guitar, vocals 
Dez Cadena - guitar
Marky Ramone - drums

Balzac
Hirosuke - vocals
Atsushi - guitar
Akio - bass
Takayuki - drums

Additional performers
John Cafiero - backing vocals on "Day the Earth Caught Fire"

Production
Alan Douches - Mixing and mastering of "Day the Earth Caught Fire" at West West Side Music
Jesse Cannon - Engineering of "Day the Earth Caught Fire"
Tetsuya Kotani - Engineering and mixing of "The Haunting / Don't Open 'Til Doomsday" at Omega Sound
Akihiko Takenaka - Mastering of "The Haunting / Don't Open 'Til Doomsday" at Heart Beat

References

Balzac (band) songs
Misfits (band) songs
Horror punk songs
Split singles